Lipoate–protein ligase (LplA, lipoate protein ligase, lipoate–protein ligase A, LPL, LPL-B) is an enzyme with systematic name ATP:lipoate adenylyltransferase. This enzyme catalyses the following chemical reaction

 (1) ATP + lipoate  diphosphate + lipoyl-AMP
 (2) lipoyl-AMP + apoprotein  protein N6-(lipoyl)lysine + AMP

This enzyme requires Mg2+ as a cofactor.

References

External links 
 

EC 2.7.7